Celal Kandemiroglu was a graphic artist in the German computer games industry. He was born in 1953 in Turkey and made his first comic when he was five years old. After graduating at the fine arts academy in Istanbul he started to offer his comics to the Bastei-Verlag in Germany around 1978. Since 1985 he has created many video and movie covers until he became a cover artist for the German computer game industry in 1988. He died in 2022.

Celal created more than 800 illustrations between 1982 and 2000, some of them more detailed, others done in a rush. Besides that, he created the in-game graphics for many games.

List of games
 Battle Stations (1990), Magic Bytes
 Dragonflight (1990), Thalion Software
 Legend of Faerghail (1990), reLINE Software
 M.U.D.S. (1990), Rainbow Arts
 X-Out (1990), Rainbow Arts
 Masterblazer (1991), LucasArts
 Fate: Gates of Dawn (1991), reLINE Software
 Monster Business (1991), Eclipse Software Design
 The Patrician (1992), ASCARON Entertainment GmbH
 Der Planer (1994), Greenwood Entertainment
 Mad News (1994), Ikarion
 Menateus (1995), Siemens Nixdorf
 Biing!: Sex, Intrigue and Scalpels (1995), Magic Bytes
 Elisabeth I. (1995), Ascon
 Emergency: Fighters for Life (1998), TopWare Interactive
 Zeus (1998), Blissware Entertainment
 Panzer Elite (1999), Psygnosis Limited
 Sacred (2004), Take-Two Interactive
 Sacred Plus (2004), KOCH Media UK Ltd.
 Soeldner: Secret Wars (2004), JoWooD Productions Software AG

List of famous cover paintings
 (1988) Axxiom / Micro Partner - Spinworld
 (1988) EAS - Zero Gravity
 (1988) Rainbow Arts - Volleyball Simulator
 (1988) Time Warp / Rainbow Arts - Detector
 (1989) Magic Bytes - Air Supply
 (1989) Factor 5 - Denaris aka Katakis
 (1989) Rainbow Arts - Rock'N'Roll
 (1989) Rainbow Arts - Spherical
 (1989) Rainbow Arts - X-Out
 (1989) Rainbow Arts / TimeWarp - Berlin 1948 - East vs. West
 (1989) reLINE Software - Dyter-07
 (1989) Starbyte - Tie Break
 (1990) Magic Bytes - Big Business
 (1990) Magic Bytes / Micro Partner - Domination
 (1990) Play Byte / Psygnosis - Atomino
 (1990) Rainbow Arts - Turrican
 (1990) Rainbow Arts - M.U.D.S.
 (1990) Rainbow Arts - Masterblazer
 (1990) Rainbow Arts - Z-Out
 (1990) Rainbow Arts / Amiga Artists - Startrash
 (1990) reLINE - Legend of Faerghail
 (1990) Starbyte - Crime Time
 (1990) Thalion - Dragonflight
 (1990) Thalion / Eclipse - Wings of Death
 (1991) Eclipse - Lethal Xcess
 (1991) Eclipse - Monster Business
 (1991) Rainbow Arts - Turrican II
 (1991) reLINE Software - Fate: Gates of Dawn
 (1992) Eclipse - Stoneage
 (1992) Thalion - No Second Prize
 (1993) Rainbow Arts - Turrican 3
 (1995) reline / Magic Bytes - Biing!
 (1999) Wings Simulation - Panzer Elite
 (2004) Take-Two Interactive - Sacred
 (2004) Wings Simulation - Soeldner (Secret Wars)

External links
 Temple of Celal
 Interview with Celal Kandemiroglu

1953 births
Living people
German people of Turkish descent